Ronald E. Carrier (August 18, 1932 – September 18, 2017) was the fourth President of James Madison University (JMU), having served from 1971 to 1998. Carrier presided over JMU as it grew dramatically in size and in reputation. Carrier most recently served as the university's chancellor.  Carrier Library on the JMU campus is named for him.

During his time as president Carrier expanded JMU "from a prominently female institution holding 4,000 students to a co-ed university with 14,000 students. Carrier expanded the grounds of JMU more than 100 acres, and he is largely credited with the vision of East Campus, and the resulting expansion of the university to the eastern side of I-81. A total of 40 new buildings were also constructed at a cost of 210 million dollars."

Carrier was affectionately known on campus as "Uncle Ron," a reflection of his connection with students.

Carrier was a graduate of East Tennessee State University and on the faculty of Memphis State University (now the University of Memphis) before going to JMU.

References

External links 
 Ronald Carrier curriculum vitae
 JMU Madison magazine article "Remembering Ronald E. Carrier"

1932 births
2017 deaths
Presidents of James Madison University
East Tennessee State University alumni
University of Memphis faculty